Ravi Varma (born 29 September  1975) is an Indian actor who appears in Telugu films. Known for playing supporting roles, Varma debuted as an actor with Telugu romantic comedy film, Vennela, written and directed by Deva Katta, starring Raja and Parvati Melton as well as Sharwanand, which released in the year 2005.

Early life and career
Varma was born in East Godavari District, Andhra Pradesh, India and brought up in Hyderabad, since 2 years of age. After high school, he studied engineering at Chaitanya Bharathi Institute of Technology in Hyderabad and went to New York City to finish his master's degree and found a job at Rediff. Varma enrolled in a 3-month course at New York Film Academy. Later, he was offered the role of Syed in Vennela in 2005. He debuted in Tamil with Sathya, which was a remake of Kshanam.

Filmography

 Vennela (2005)
 Rakhi (2006)
 Sainikudu (2006)
 Bommarillu (2006)
 Nuvve (2006)
 Classmates (2007)
 Naa Manasukemaindi (2007)
 Bhadradri (2008)
 Nagaram (2008)
 Ready (2008)
 Jalsa (2008)
 Inkosaari (2010)
 Virodhi (2011)
 Chinna Cinema (2013)
 1 (2014)
 Weekend Love (2014)
 Boochamma Boochodu (2014)
 Ala Ela (2014)
 Tungabhadra (2015)
 Calling Bell (2015)
 Asura (2015)
 Srimanthudu (2015)
 Kshanam (2016)
 Terror (2016)
 Raja Cheyyi Vesthe (2016)
 Jayammu Nischayammu Raa (2016)
 Appatlo Okadundevadu (2016)
 The Ghazi Attack (2017)
 Fashion Designer s/o Ladies Tailor (2017)
 PSV Garuda Vega (2017)
 Balakrishnudu (2017)
 Sathya (2017) (Tamil)
 Napoleon (2017)
 Pantham (2018)
 Taxiwaala (2018)
Kartha Karma Kriya (2018)
24 Kisses (2018)
Vinaya Vidheya Rama (2019)
Mithai (2019)
Udyama Simham (2019)
Nuvvu Thopu Raa (2019)
 Rajdooth (2019)
Saaho (2019)
Raagala 24 Gantallo (2019)
Entha Manchivaadavuraa (2020)
Pressure Cooker (2020)
 HIT: The First Case (2020)
 47 Days (2020)
 Buchinaidu Khandriga (2020)
 Valayam (2020)
 Uppena (2021)
 Thellavarithe Guruvaram (2021)
 Mosagallu (2021)
 Pachchis (2021)
 Kanabadutaledu (2021)
 Ichata Vahanamulu Niluparadu (2021)
 Republic (2021)
 Bheemla Nayak    (2022)
 Bhala Thandanana (2022)
 The Ghost (2022)
 Neetho (2022)
 Michael (2023)

Television 
 SIN (2020); Aha
11th Hour (2021); Aha
Loser 2  (2021); ZEE5
9 Hours (2022); Disney+ Hotstar
Hello World  (2022); ZEE5

References

External links
 

Living people
Telugu male actors
New York Film Academy alumni
1973 births
Male actors in Telugu cinema
People from East Godavari district
Male actors from Andhra Pradesh
Indian male film actors
21st-century Indian male actors